AEK Athens F.C. is a professional football club based in Nea Filadelfeia, Athens, Greece, which plays in Super League Greece. This chronological list comprises all those who have held the position of manager of the first team of AEK Athens  from 1927, when the first professional manager was appointed, to the present day. Each manager's entry includes his dates of tenure and the club's overall competitive record (in terms of matches won, drawn and lost), honours won and significant achievements while under his care. Caretaker managers are included, where known.  The club had 67 different managers from across the globe throughout their 98 years of existence.

Managerial history

AEK Athens first captain Kostas Negrepontis has the record of the most seasons as the first team's head coach with 12 seasons. The record with the most titles belongs to Dušan Bajević who won 4 Greek Championships,1 Greek Cup,1 League Cup,1 Super Cup and 1 Mediterranean Games Cup.

{| class="wikitable" style="text-align: center"
|-
! rowspan=2| Season
! colspan=2| Manager
! colspan=2| Period
! rowspan=2| Competition
! colspan=9| Record
! rowspan=2| Honours
|-
! 
! Name
! From
! To
! 
! 
! 
! 
! 
! 
! 
! 
! 
|-
| 1927–28 
| 
| align=left| Joseph Sveg
| align=left| 1927
| align=left| 1928
| Easter Cup
| 4||2||1||1||13||10||+3||50.00||62.50
| —
|-
| rowspan=3| 1930–31
| rowspan=3| 
| rowspan=3 align=left| Emil Rauchmaul
| rowspan=3 align=left| 1930
| rowspan=3 align=left| 1931
| bgcolor=#C0C0C0| EPSA
| 6||5||0||1||17||13||+4||83.33||83.33
| rowspan=3| —
|-
| Panhellenic Championship
| 14||5||3||6||19||31||-12||35.71||46.43
|-
! Total
! 20!!10!!3!!7!!36!!44!!-8!!50.00!!57.50
|-
| rowspan=3| 1931–32
| rowspan=7| 
| rowspan=7 align=left|Themos Asderis
| rowspan=7 align=left| 1931
| rowspan=7 align=left| 1933
| Panhellenic Championship
| 14||4||1||9||13||35||-22||28.57||32.14
| rowspan=7| Greek Cup: 1
|-
| Relegation play-offs
| 2||1||1||0||5||3||+2||50.00||75.00
|-
| bgcolor=#FFD700| Greek Cup
| 2||1||1||0||5||3||+2||50.00||75.00
|-
| rowspan=4| 1932–33
| bgcolor=#C0C0C0| Panhellenic Championship Southern Group
| 8||4||2||2||17||14||+3||50.00||62.50
|-
| bgcolor=#CD7F32| Panhellenic Championship
| 3||0||0||3||2||7||-5||00.00||00.00
|-
| Greek Cup3
| 3||1||1||1||4||3||+1||33.33||50.00
|-
! Total
! 32!!11!!6!!15!!46!!65!!-19!!34.38!!43.75
|-
| rowspan=2| 1933–34
| rowspan=6| 
| rowspan=6 align=left| Kostas Negrepontis
| rowspan=6 align=left| 1933
| rowspan=6 align=left| 1936
| bgcolor=#C0C0C0| EPSA
| 10||3||4||3||14||15||-1||33.33||50.00
| rowspan=6| —
|-
| Panhellenic Championship Southern Group
| 10||1||1||8||9||30||-21||10.00||15.00
|-
| rowspan=2| 1934–35
| EPSA
| 2||2||0||0||4||0||+4||100.00||100.00
|-
| Panhellenic Championship Southern Group
| 10||2||3||5||14||23||-9||20.00||35.00
|-
| rowspan=2| 1935–36
| Panhellenic Championship
| 14||3||6||5||16||22||-6||21.43||42.86
|-
! Total
! 46!!11!!14!!21!!57!!90!!-33!!23.91!!39.13
|-
| 1936–37
| 
| align=left| Themos Asderis
| align=left| 1936
| align=left| 1937
| bgcolor=#C0C0C0| EPSA
| 10||?||?||?||35||15||+24||??.??||80.00
| —
|-
| 1937–38
| rowspan=19 | 
| rowspan=19 align=left| Kostas Negrepontis
| rowspan=19 align=left| 1937
| rowspan=19 align=left| 1948
| bgcolor=#C0C0C0| EPSA
| 10||?||?||?||31||10||+21||??.??||80.00
| rowspan=19| Greek League: 2Greek Cup: 1EPSA: 3
|-
| rowspan=4| 1938–39
| bgcolor=#C0C0C0| EPSA
| 10||?||?||?||31||13||+18||??.??||83.33
|-
| bgcolor=#FFD700| Panhellenic Championship Southern Group
| 14||10||1||3||54||22||+32||71.43||83.33
|-
| bgcolor=#FFD700| Panhellenic Championship
| 2||2||0||0||7||3||+4||100.00||100.00
|-
| bgcolor=#FFD700| Greek Cup
| 4||4||0||0||14||3||+11||100.00||100.00
|-
| rowspan=4| 1939–40
| bgcolor=#FFD700| EPSA
| 14||14||0||0||61||10||+51||100.00||100.00
|-
| bgcolor=#FFD700| Panhellenic Championship Southern Group
| 14||13||0||1||48||14||+34||92.86||95.24
|-
| bgcolor=#FFD700| Panhellenic Championship
| 2||2||0||0||5||3||+2||100.00||100.00
|-
| bgcolor=#CD7F32| Greek Cup3
| 4||2||2||0||12||4||+8||50.00||83.33
|-
| 1940–41
| EPSA
| 3||3||0||0||12||2||+10||100.00||100.00
|-
| 1944–45
| EPSA
| 6||5||1||0||30||5||+25||83.33||94.44
|-
| rowspan=2| 1945–46
| bgcolor=#FFD700| EPSA
| 15||?||?||?||49||19||+31||??.??||84.44
|-
| bgcolor=#C0C0C0| Panhellenic Championship
| 4||1||2||1||3||5||-2||25.00||66.67
|-
| rowspan=3| 1946–47
| bgcolor=#FFD700| EPSA
| 14||?||?||?||29||12||+17||??.??||83.33
|-
| Panhellenic Championship
| 10||4||1||5||15||16||-1||40.00||53.33
|-
| Greek Cup
| 1||0||0||1||1||2||-1||00.00||33.33
|-
| rowspan=5| 1947–48
| bgcolor=#CD7F32| EPSA
| 14||?||?||?||31||23||+8||??.??||71.43
|-
| Greek Cup (1)
| ?||?||?||?||?||?||?||??.??||??.??
|-
! Total
! 141!!?!!?!!?!!433!!166!!+267!!??.??!!83.54
|-
| 
| align=left| Giorgos Daispangos1
| align=left| 1948
| align=left| 1948
| 
| ?||?||?||?||?||?||?||?||?
| —
|-
| rowspan=8| 
| rowspan=8 align=left| Jack Beby
| rowspan=8 align=left| 1948
| rowspan=8 align=left| 1951
| bgcolor=#C0C0C0| Greek Cup (2)
| ?||?||?||?||?||?||?||?||?
| rowspan=8|Greek Cup: 2EPSA: 1
|-
| rowspan=2| 1948–49
| EPSA
| 16||?||?||?||28||16||+12||??.??||72.92
|-
| bgcolor=#FFD700| Greek Cup3
| 5||4||1||0||17||4||+13||80.00||93.33
|-
| rowspan=2| 1949–50
| bgcolor=#FFD700| EPSA
| 18||?||?||?||37||16||+21||??.??||85.19
|-
| bgcolor=#FFD700| Greek Cup3
| 10||6||4||0||35||5||+30||60.00||86.67
|-
| rowspan=4| 1950–51
| bgcolor=#C0C0C0| EPSA 
| 10||?||?||?||12||8||+4||??.??||73.33
|-
| Greek Cup
| ?||?||?||?||?||?||?||?||?
|-
! Total
! ?!!?!!?!!?!!?!!?!!?!!?!!?
|-
| rowspan=4| 
| rowspan=4 align=left| Tryfon Tzanetis
| rowspan=4 align=left| 1951
| rowspan=4 align=left| 1952
| 
| ?||?||?||?||?||?||?||?||?
| rowspan=4| —
|-
| rowspan=3| 1951–52
| bgcolor=#C0C0C0| EPSA 
| 10||?||?||?||23||13||+10||??.??||80.00
|-
| bgcolor=#CD7F32| Greek Cup3
| 4||1||2||1||7||3||+4||25.00||66.67
|-
! Total
! ?!!?!!?!!?!!?!!?!!?!!??.??!!??.??
|-
| rowspan=3| 1952–53
| rowspan=3| 
| rowspan=3 align=left| Mario Magnozzi
| rowspan=3 align=left| 1952
| rowspan=3 align=left| 1953–05
| bgcolor=#CD7F32| EPSA
| 9||5||1||3||23||10||+13||55.56||73.37
| rowspan=3| —
|-
| bgcolor=#C0C0C0| Greek Cup3
| 4||3||0||1||9||5||+4||75.00||83.33
|-
! Total
! 13!!8!!1!!4!!32!!15!!61.54!!?!!76.92
|-
| rowspan=5| 1953–54
| rowspan=4| 
| rowspan=4 align=left| Ted Crawford
| rowspan=4 align=left| 1953
| rowspan=4 align=left| 1954
| bgcolor=#C0C0C0| EPSA
| 10||4||4||2||15||8||+7||40.00||73.33
| rowspan=4| —
|-
| Panhellenic Championship (1)
| ?||?||?||?||?||?||?||?||?
|-
| Greek Cup3
| 2||0||1||1||0||1||-1||00.00||50.00
|-
! Total
! ?!!?!!?!!?!!?!!?!!?!!?!!?
|-
| 
| align=left| Giorgos Daispangos
| align=left| 1954
| align=left| 1954
| Panhellenic Championship (2)
| ?||?||?||?||?||?||?||?||?
| —
|-
| rowspan=3| 1954–55
| rowspan=3| 
| rowspan=3 align=left| Tryfon Tzanetis
| rowspan=3 align=left| 1954
| rowspan=3 align=left| 1955
| bgcolor=#CD7F32| EPSA
| 14||9||1||4||26||13||+13||64.29||78.57
| rowspan=3| —
|-
| Greek Cup3
| 3||1||1||1||5||4||+1||33.33||66.67
|-
! Total
! 17!!10!!2!!5!!31!!17!!14!!58.82!!76.47
|-
| rowspan=2| 1955–56
| rowspan=4| 
| rowspan=4 align=left| Kostas Negrepontis
| rowspan=4 align=left| 1955
| rowspan=4 align=left| 1957–02
| EPSA
| 14||4||3||7||15||19||-4||28.57||69.05
| rowspan=4| Greek Cup: 1
|-
| bgcolor=#FFD700| Greek Cup
| 5||5||0||0||18||6||+12||100.00||100.00
|-
| rowspan=3| 1956–57
| EPSA
| 14||5||6||3||21||15||+6||35.71||74.43
|-
! Total
! 33!!14!!9!!10!!54!!40!!+14!!42.42!!70.71
|-
| 
| align=left| Tryfon Tzanetis
| align=left| 1957–02
| align=left| 1957–08
| Greek Cup
| 2||1||0||1||2||2||0||50.00||66.67
| —
|-
| rowspan=4| 1957–58
| rowspan=3| 
| rowspan=3 align=left| Rino Martini
| rowspan=3 align=left| 1957
| rowspan=3 align=left| 1958
| bgcolor=#C0C0C0| EPSA
| 14||10||2||2||30||14||+16||71.43||85.71
| rowspan=3| —
|-
| Panhellenic Championship
| ?||?||?||?||?||?||?||??.??||??.??
|-
! Total
! ?!!?!!?!!?!!?!!?!!?!!?!!?
|-
| rowspan=5| 
| rowspan=5 align=left| Kostas Negrepontis
| rowspan=5 align=left| 1958
| rowspan=5 align=left| 1959
| 
| ?||?||?||?||?||?||?||?||?
| rowspan=5| —
|-
| rowspan=4| 1958–59
| bgcolor=#CD7F32| EPSA
| 14||6||7||1||17||8||+9||42.86||78.57
|-
| bgcolor=#C0C0C0| Panhellenic Championship
| 18||12||4||2||39||20||+19||66.67||85.19
|-
| Greek Cup3
| 4||2||1||1||8||6||+2||50.00||75.00
|-
! Total
! ?!!?!!?!!?!!?!!?!!?!!?!!?
|-
| rowspan=3| 1959–60
| rowspan=6| 
| rowspan=6 align=left| Lukas "Harry" Aurednik
| rowspan=6 align=left| 1959
| rowspan=6 align=left| 1961–01
| bgcolor=#C0C0C0| Alpha Ethniki
| 30||21||7||2||72||27||+45||70.00||87.78
| rowspan=6| —
|-
| bgcolor=#C0C0C0| Alpha Ethniki Play-off
| 1||0||0||1||1||2||-1||00.00||00.00
|-
| Greek Cup
| 6||5||0||1||19||5||+14||83.33||88.89
|-
| rowspan=6| 1960–61
| Alpha Ethniki (1)
| 12||7||1||4||24||13||+11||58.33||75.00
|-
| Greek Cup
| 1||1||0||0||9||0||+9||100.00||100.00
|-
! Total
! 50!!34!!8!!8!!125!!47!!+78!!68.00!!84.00
|-
| rowspan=6| 
| rowspan=6 align=left| Tryfon Tzanetis
| rowspan=6 align=left| 1961–01
| rowspan=6 align=left| 1962
| Alpha Ethniki (2)
| 18||11||5||2||42||17||+25||61.11||83.33
| rowspan=6| —
|-
| Greek Cup (2)
| 7||6||0||1||29||10||+19||85.71||90.48
|-
| Balkans Cup
| 4||1||1||2||8||12||-4||25.00||37.50
|-
| rowspan=3| 1961–62
| Alpha Ethniki
| 30||19||6||5||73||31||+42||63.33||81.11
|-
| Greek Cup
| 1||0||0||1||1||2||-1||00.00||00.00
|-
! Total
! 60!!37!!12!!11!!153!!72!!+81!!61.67!!80.68
|-
| rowspan=4| 1962–63
| rowspan=4| 
| rowspan=4 align=left| Jenő Csaknády
| rowspan=4 align=left| 1962
| rowspan=4 align=left| 1963
| bgcolor=#FFD700| Alpha Ethniki
| 30||20||7||3||66||21||+45||66.67||85.56
| rowspan=4| Greek League: 1
|-
| Alpha Ethniki Play-off
| 1||0||1||0||3||3||0||66.67||66.67
|-
| Greek Cup
| 3||2||0||1||10||2||+8||67.71||77.78
|-
! Total
! 34!!22!!8!!4!!79!!26!!+53!!66.67!!83.31
|-
| rowspan=4| 1963–64
| rowspan=4| 
| rowspan=4 align=left| Heinrich Müller
| rowspan=4 align=left| 1963
| rowspan=4 align=left| 1964
| bgcolor=#CD7F32| Alpha Ethniki
| 30||18||5||7||72||25||+47||60.00||59.17
| rowspan=4| Greek Cup: 1
|-
| bgcolor=#FFD700| Greek Cup3
| 4||4||0||0||14||1||+13||100.00||100.00
|-
| European Cup
| 2||0||1||1||8||3||+5||00.00||50.00
|-
! Total
! 36!!22!!6!!8!!94!!29!!+65!!61.11!!79.63
|-
| rowspan=4| 1964–65
| rowspan=4| 
| rowspan=4 align=left| Mirko Kokotović
| rowspan=4 align=left| 1964
| rowspan=4 align=left| 1965
| bgcolor=#C0C0C0| Alpha Ethniki
| 30||18||10||2||64||22||+42||60.00||84.44
| rowspan=4| —
|-
| Greek Cup
| 3||2||0||1||9||3||+6||66.67||77.78
|-
| European Cup Winners' Cup
| 2||1||0||1||2||3||-1||50.00||66.67
|-
! Total
! 35!!21!!10!!4!!75!!28!!+47!!60.00!!82.86
|-
| rowspan=2| 1965–66
| rowspan=6| 
| rowspan=6 align=left| Tryfon Tzanetis
| rowspan=6 align=left| 1965
| rowspan=6 align=left| 1967–01–21
| bgcolor=#CD7F32| Alpha Ethniki
| 30||19||5||6||58||26||+32||63.33||80.00
| rowspan=6| Greek Cup: 1
|-
| bgcolor=#FFD700| Greek Cup
| 5||5||0||0||13||4||+9||100.00||100.00
|-
| rowspan=7| 1966–67
| Alpha Ethniki (1)
| 13||8||3||2||20||13||+7||61.54||82.05
|-
| European Cup Winners' Cup
| 2||0||0||2||2||4||-2||00.00||33.33
|-
| Balkans Cup (1)
| 3||2||1||0||7||3||+4||66.67||83.33
|-
! Total
! 53!!34!!9!!10!!100!!50!!+50!!64.15!!81.41
|-
| rowspan=7| 
| rowspan=7 align=left| Jenő Csaknády
| rowspan=7 align=left| 1967–01–22 
| rowspan=7 align=left| 1968
| bgcolor=#C0C0C0| Alpha Ethniki (2)
| 17||10||7||0||32||8||+24||58.82||86.27
| rowspan=7| Greek League: 1
|-
| Greek Cup
| 3||2||0||1||10||3||+7||66.67||77.78
|-
| bgcolor=#C0C0C0| Balkans Cup (2)
| 6||3||1||2||6||6||0||50.00||58.33
|-
| rowspan=4| 1967–68
| bgcolor=#FFD700| Alpha Ethniki
| 34||22||6||6||68||24||+44||64.71||73.53
|-
| bgcolor=#CD7F32| Greek Cup
| 4||3||0||1||5||3||+2||75.00||75.00
|-
| Balkans Cup
| 6||1||2||3||7||12||-5||16.67||33.33
|-
! Total
! 70!!41!!16!!13!!128!!56!!+72!!58.57!!80.30
|-
| rowspan=3| 1968–69
| rowspan=15| 
| rowspan=15 align=left| Branko Stanković
| rowspan=15 align=left| 1968
| rowspan=15 align=left| 1973–02–07
| Alpha Ethniki
| 34||17||8||9||58||31||+27||50.00||74.51
| rowspan=15| Greek League: 1
|-
| Greek Cup
| 2||1||0||1||7||4||+3||50.00||66.67
|-
| European Cup
| 6||2||2||2||10||6||+4||33.33||66.67
|-
| rowspan=2| 1969–70
| bgcolor=#C0C0C0| Alpha Ethniki
| 34||21||9||4||55||23||+32||61.76||83.33
|-
| Greek Cup4
| 1||0||0||1||1||1||0||00.00||33.33
|-
| rowspan=3| 1970–71
| bgcolor=#FFD700| Alpha Ethniki
| 34||23||8||3||67||18||+49||67.65||86.27
|-
| bgcolor=#CD7F32| Greek Cup
| 10||9||0||1||59||7||+52||90.00||93.33
|-
| Inter-Cities Fairs Cup
| 2||0||0||2||0||4||-4||00.00||33.33
|-
| rowspan=3| 1971–72
| bgcolor=#CD7F32| Alpha Ethniki
| 34||20||8||6||57||23||+34||58.82||80.39
|-
| Greek Cup3
| 3||2||0||1||8||2||+6||66.67||77.78
|-
| European Cup
| 2||1||0||1||4||6||-2||50.00||66.67
|-
| rowspan=6| 1972–73
| Alpha Ethniki (1)
| 18||8||8||2||22||16||+6||44.44||77.78
|-
| Greek Cup
| 3||2||0||1||12||2||+10||66.67||77.78
|-
| UEFA Cup
| 4||1||1||2||5||8||-3||25.00||58.33
|-
! Total
! 187!!107!!44!!36!!365!!151!!+214!!57.22!!79.32
|-
| 
| align=left| Kostas Chatzimichail1
| align=left| 1973–02–08
| align=left| 1973–02–22
| Alpha Ethniki (2)
| 1||0||0||1||0||2||-2||00.00||00.00
| —
|-
| 
| align=left| Billy Bingham
| align=left| 1973–02–23
| align=left| 1973–06
| Alpha Ethniki (3)
| 15||5||3||7||17||18||-1||33.33||62.22
| —
|-
| rowspan=4| 1973–74
| rowspan=3| 
| rowspan=3 align=left| Stan Anderson
| rowspan=3 align=left| 1973–08
| rowspan=3 align=left| 1974–04–19
| Alpha Ethiki (1)
| 27||12||6||9||44||31||+13||44.44||55.56
| rowspan=3| —
|-
| Greek Cup4
| 3||2||0||1||4||3||+1||66.67||66.67
|-
! Total
! 30!!14!!6!!10!!48!!34!!+14!!46.67!!56.67
|-
| 
| align=left| Kostas Chatzimichail1
| align=left| 1974–04–19
| align=left| 1974–06
| Alpha Ethniki (2)
| 7||4||2||1||9||5||+4||57.14||71.43
| —
|-
| rowspan=2| 1974–75
| rowspan=11| 
| rowspan=11 align=left| František Fadrhonc
| rowspan=11 align=left| 1974
| rowspan=11 align=left| 1977–09–23
| bgcolor=#C0C0C0|Alpha Ethiki
| 34||23||9||2||73||20||+53||67.65||80.88
| rowspan=11| —
|-
| Greek Cup
| 3||2||0||1||5||1||+4||66.67||66.67
|-
| rowspan=3| 1975–76
| bgcolor=#C0C0C0| Alpha Ethiki
| 30||18||8||4||57||18||+39||60.00||73.33
|-
| bgcolor=#CD7F32| Greek Cup
| 4||3||0||1||16||3||+13||75.00||75.00
|-
| UEFA Cup
| 4||2||1||1||4||3||+1||50.00||62.50
|-
| rowspan=3| 1976–77
| Alpha Ethiki
| 34||24||3||7||63||29||+34||70.59||75.00
|-
| Greek Cup
| 3||2||0||1||6||4||+2||66.67||66.67
|-
| bgcolor=#CD7F32| UEFA Cup4
| 10||5||0||5||15||15||0||50.00||50.00
|-
| rowspan=8| 1977–78
| Alpha Ethiki (1)
| 2||1||0||1||6||3||+3||50.00||50.00
|-
| UEFA Cup
| 2||1||0||1||3||1||+2||50.00||50.00
|-
! Total
! 126!!81!!21!!24!!248!!97!!+151!!64.29!!72.62
|-
| 
| align=left| Andreas Stamatiadis1
| align=left| 1977–09–24
| align=left| 1977–10–10
| Alpha Ethniki (2)
| 2||2||0||0||7||1||+6||100.00||100.00
| —
|-
| rowspan=4| 
| rowspan=4 align=left| Zlatko Čajkovski
| rowspan=4 align=left| 1977–10–11
| rowspan=4 align=left| 1978–06–10
| bgcolor=#FFD700| Alpha Ethniki (3)
| 30||18||11||1||61||22||+39||60.00||78.33
| rowspan=4| Greek League: 1Greek Cup: 1
|-
| bgcolor=#FFD700| Greek Cup
| 6||6||0||0||22||4||+18||100.00||100.00
|-
| UEFA Cup (3)
| 2||0||1||1||3||6||-3||00.00||25.00
|-
! Total
! 38!!24!!12!!2!!86!!32!!+54!!63.16!!78.95
|-
| rowspan=7| 1978–79
| rowspan=4| 
| rowspan=4 align=left| Ferenc Puskás
| rowspan=4 align=left| 1978–06
| rowspan=4 align=left| 1979–03–17
| Alpha Ethniki (1)
| 23||15||5||3||51||20||+31||65.22||76.09
| rowspan=4| —
|-
| Greek Cup (1)
| 4||3||1||0||14||3||+11||75.00||87.50
|-
| European Cup
| 4||1||0||3||9||12||-3||25.00||25.00
|-
! Total
! 31!!19!!6!!6!!74!!35!!+33!!61.29!!70.97
|-
| rowspan=3| 
| rowspan=3 align=left| Andreas Stamatiadis
| rowspan=3 align=left| 1979–03–18
| rowspan=3 align=left| 1979–06
| bgcolor=#FFD700| Alpha Ethniki (2)
| 11||10||1||0||39||9||+30||90.91||95.45
| rowspan=3| Greek League: 1
|-
| bgcolor=#C0C0C0| Greek Cup (2)
| 4||2||0||2||10||7||+3||50.00||50.00
|-
! Total
! 15!!12!!1!!2!!49!!16!!+33!!80.00!!83.33
|-
| rowspan=6| 1979–80
| rowspan=4| 
| rowspan=4 align=left| Hermann Stessl
| rowspan=4 align=left| 1979–06–22
| rowspan=4 align=left| 1980–03–26
| Alpha Ethniki (1)
| 26||13||7||6||50||30||+20||50.00||63.46
| rowspan=4| —
|-
| Greek Cup3
| 3||2||0||1||9||5||+4||66.67||66.67
|-
| European Cup
| 2||1||0||1||2||3||-1||50.00||50.00
|-
! Total
! 31!!16!!7!!11!!61!!38!!+23!!51.61!!62.90
|-
| rowspan=6| 
| rowspan=6 align=left| Miltos Papapostolou2
| rowspan=6 align=left| 1980–03–27
| rowspan=6 align=left| 1981–06
| Alpha Ethniki (2)
| 8||5||2||1||14||9||+5||62.50||75.00
| rowspan=6| —
|-
| bgcolor=#C0C0C0| Alpha Ethniki Play-off
| 1||0||0||1||0||1||-1||00.00||00.00
|-
| rowspan=4| 1980–81
| bgcolor=#C0C0C0| Alpha Ethiniki
| 34||17||10||7||63||42||+21||50.00||64.71
|-
| bgcolor=#CD7F32| Greek Cup
| 8||4||1||3||14||10||+4||50.00||56.25
|-
| Balkans Cup
| 4||2||0||2||7||7||0||50.00||50.00
|-
! Total
! 55!!28!!13!!14!!98!!69!!+29!!50.91!!62.73
|-
| rowspan=5| 1981–82
| rowspan=3| 
| rowspan=3 align=left| Hans Tilkowski
| rowspan=3 align=left| 1981–06–19
| rowspan=3 align=left| 1982–01–26
| Alpha Ethniki (1)
| 17||7||6||4||20||15||+5||41.18||58.82
| rowspan=3| —
|-
| Greek Cup (1)
| 1||1||0||0||3||2||+1||100.00||100.00
|-
! Total
! 18!!8!!6!!4!!23!!17!!+6!!44.44!!61.11
|-
| rowspan=6| 
| rowspan=6 align=left| Zlatko Čajkovski
| rowspan=6 align=left| 1982–01–27
| rowspan=6 align=left| 1983–01–10
| Alpha Ethniki (2)
| 17||10||5||2||35||20||+15||58.82||73.53
| rowspan=6| —
|-
| Greek Cup (2)
| 2||0||1||1||3||8||-5||00.00||25.00
|-
| rowspan=8| 1982–83
| Alpha Ethniki (1)
| 13||8||2||3||23||16||+7||61.54||69.23
|-
| Greek Cup (1)
| 1||1||0||0||2||1||+1||100.00||100.00
|-
| UEFA Cup
| 2||0||0||2||0||6||-6||00.00||00.00
|-
! Total
! 35!!19!!8!!8!!63!!51!!+12!!54.29!!65.71
|-
| 
| align=left| Kostas Nestoridis1
| align=left| 1983–01–11
| align=left| 1983–02–13
| Alpha Ethniki (2)
| 5||3||2||0||6||3||+3||60.00||80.00
| —
|- 
| rowspan=3| 
| rowspan=3 align=left| Helmut Senekowitsch
| rowspan=3 align=left| 1983–02–14
| rowspan=3 align=left| 1983–06
| bgcolor=#CD7F32| Alpha Ethniki (3) 
| 16||8||3||5||25||20||+5||50.00||59.38
| rowspan=3| Greek Cup: 1
|-
| bgcolor=#FFD700| Greek Cup (2)
| 8||7||0||1||21||7||+14||87.50||87.50
|-
! Total
! 24!!15!!3!!6!!46!!27!!+19!!46.15!!68.75
|-
| rowspan=9| 1983–84
| rowspan=3| 
| rowspan=3 align=left| John Barnwell
| rowspan=3 align=left| 1983–07–24
| rowspan=3 align=left| 1983–11–28
| Alpha Ethniki (1)
| 12||5||2||5||18||10||+8||41.67||50.00
| rowspan=3| —
|-
| European Cup Winners' Cup
| 2||1||0||1||3||4||-1||50.00||50.00
|-
! Total
! 14!!6!!2!!6!!21!!14!!+7!!42.86!!50.00
|-
| rowspan=3| 
| rowspan=3 align=left| Helmut Senekowitsch
| rowspan=3 align=left| 1983–11
| rowspan=3 align=left| 1984–02
| Alpha Ethniki (2)
| 8||2||3||3||11||11||0||25.00||43.75
| rowspan=3| —
|-
| Greek Cup (1)4
| 3||3||0||0||3||0||+3||100.00||100.00
|-
! Total
! 11!!5!!3!!3!!14!!11!!+3!!45.45!!59.09
|-
| rowspan=3| 
| rowspan=3 align=left| Kostas Nestoridis1
| rowspan=3 align=left| 1984–02
| rowspan=3 align=left| 1984–06
| Alpha Ethniki (3)
| 10||5||1||4||11||10||+1||50.00||55.00
| rowspan=3| —
|-
| Greek Cup (2)
| 3||1||1||1||3||2||+1||33.33||50.00
|-
! Total
! 13!!6!!2!!5!!14!!12!!+2!!46.15!!53.85
|-
| rowspan=4| 1984–85
| rowspan=3| 
| rowspan=3 align=left| Václav Halama
| rowspan=3 align=left| 1984–06
| rowspan=3 align=left| 1984–12–11
| Alpha Ethniki
| 10||4||5||1||20||11||+9||40.00||65.00
| rowspan=3| —
|-
| Greek Cup
| 1||0||0||1||0||1||-1||00.00||00.00
|-
! Total
! 11!!4!!5!!2!!21!!12!!+8!!36.36!!59.09
|-
| 
| align=left| Antonis Georgiadis
| align=left| 1984–12–11
| align=left| 1985–06–25
| bgcolor=#CD7F32| Alpha Ethniki (2)
| 20||12||6||2||38||17||+21||60.00||75.00
| —
|-
| rowspan=5| 1985–86
| rowspan=4| 
| rowspan=4 align=left| Jacek Gmoch
| rowspan=4 align=left| 1985–06–25
| rowspan=4 align=left| 1986–05–30
| bgcolor=#CD7F32| Alpha Ethniki
| 30||13||10||7||42||28||+14||43.33||60.00
| rowspan=4| —
|-
| bgcolor=#CD7F32| Greek Cup
| 9||5||2||2||22||7||+15||55.56||66.67
|-
| UEFA Cup
| 2||1||0||1||1||5||-4||50.00||50.00
|-
! Total
! 41!!19!!12!!10!!65!!40!!+25!!46.34!!60.98
|-
| 
| align=left| Nikos Christidis1
| align=left| 1986–05–31
| align=left| 1986–06–30
| bgcolor=#FFD700| Alpha Ethniki Play-off
| 1||1||0||0||0||0||0||100.00||100.00
| —
|-
| rowspan=6| 1986–87
| rowspan=4| 
| rowspan=4 align=left| Ab Fafié
| rowspan=4 align=left| 1986–07–07
| rowspan=4 align=left| 1986–12–30
| Alpha Ethniki (1)
| 12||4||4||4||14||12||+2||33.33||50.00
| rowspan=4| —
|-
| Greek Cup3
| 2||1||0||1||1||1||+0||50.00||50.00
|-
| UEFA Cup
| 2||0||0||2||0||3||-3||00.00||00.00
|-
! Total
! 16!!5!!4!!7!!15!!16!!-1!!31.25!!43.75
|-
| 
| align=left| Nikos Alefantos
| align=left| 1986–12–30
| align=left| 1987–05–07
| Alpha Ethniki (2)
| 14||6||4||4||17||13||+4||42.86||57.14
| —
|-
| 
| align=left| Nikos Christidis1
| align=left| 1987–05–08
| align=left| 1987–06–24
| Alpha Ethniki (3)
| 1||0||0||1||0||1||-1||00.00||00.00
| —
|-
| rowspan=3| 1987–88
| rowspan=3| 
| rowspan=3 align=left| Todor Veselinović
| rowspan=3 align=left| 1987–06–24
| rowspan=3 align=left| 1988–06–17
| bgcolor=#C0C0C0| Alpha Ethniki
| 30||15||10||5||51||31||+25||50.00||66.67
| rowspan=3| —
|-
| Greek Cup
| 5||2||1||2||9||8||+1||40.00||50.00
|-
! Total
! 35!!17!!11!!7!!60!!39!!+21!!48.57!!64.29
|-
| rowspan=3| 1988–89
| rowspan=13| 
| rowspan=29 align=left| Dušan Bajević
| rowspan=29 align=left| 1988–06–17
| rowspan=29 align=left| 1996–06–26
| bgcolor=#FFD700| Alpha Ethniki
| 30||19||6||5||45||20||+25||63.33||73.33
| rowspan=29| Greek League: 4Greek Cup: 1Greek League Cup: 1Greek Super Cup: 1Pre-Mediterranean Cup: 1
|-
| Greek Cup
| 4||3||0||1||7||4||+3||75.00||75.00
|-
| UEFA Cup
| 2||1||0||1||1||2||-1||50.00||50.00
|-
| rowspan=5| 1989–90
| bgcolor=#FFD700| Greek Super Cup3
| 1||0||1||0||1||1||0||00.00||50.00
|-
| bgcolor=#C0C0C0| Alpha Ethniki
| 34||20||10||4||64||18||+46||58.82||73.53
|-
| Greek Cup
| 6||2||2||2||6||7||-1||33.33||50.00
|-
| bgcolor=#FFD700| Greek League Cup3
| 5||3||2||0||12||7||+5||60.00||80.00
|-
| European Cup
| 4||1||1||2||6||6||0||25.00||37.50
|-
| rowspan=2| 1990–91
| bgcolor=#CD7F32| Alpha Ethniki
| 34||18||6||10||59||33||+26||52.94||61.76
|-
| Greek Cup
| 7||6||0||1||18||5||+13||85.71||85.71
|-
| rowspan=3| 1991–92
| bgcolor=#FFD700| Alpha Ethniki
| 34||23||8||3||72||25||+47||67.65||79.41
|-
| bgcolor=#CD7F32| Greek Cup3
| 12||7||4||1||21||9||+12||58.33||75.00
|-
| UEFA Cup
| 6||3||2||1||7||4||+3||50.00||66.67
|-
| rowspan=4| 1992–93
| rowspan=16| 
| bgcolor=#C0C0C0| Greek Super Cup
| 1||0||0||1||1||3||-2||00.00||00.00
|-
| bgcolor=#FFD700| Alpha Ethniki
| 34||24||6||4||78||27||+51||70.59||76.47
|-
| bgcolor=#CD7F32| Greek Cup3
| 11||7||2||2||23||10||+13||63.64||69.70
|-
| UEFA Champions League
| 4||1||2||1||4||6||-2||25.00||41.67
|-
| rowspan=4| 1993–94
| bgcolor=#C0C0C0| Greek Super Cup
| 1||0||0||1||0||1||-1||00.00||00.00
|-
| bgcolor=#FFD700| Alpha Ethniki
| 34||25||4||5||63||28||+35||73.53||77.45
|-
| bgcolor=#C0C0C0| Greek Cup3
| 12||7||5||0||35||11||+24||58.33||72.22
|-
| UEFA Champions League
| 2||0||1||1||1||2||-1||00.00||16.67
|-
| rowspan=4| 1994–95
| bgcolor=#C0C0C0| Greek Super Cup
| 1||0||0||1||0||3||-3||00.00||00.00
|-
| Alpha Ethniki
| 34||17||11||6||61||33||+28||50.00||60.78
|-
| bgcolor=#C0C0C0| Greek Cup3
| 13||12||0||1||27||5||+22||92.31||92.31
|-
| UEFA Champions League
| 8||2||2||4||6||9||-3||25.00||33.33
|-
| rowspan=4| 1995–96
| bgcolor=#C0C0C0| Alpha Ethniki
| 34||25||6||3||87||22||+65||73.53||79.41
|-
| bgcolor=#FFD700| Greek Cup
| 13||10||2||1||38||12||+26||76.92||82.05
|-
| UEFA Cup Winners' Cup
| 4||1||1||2||5||7||-2||25.00||33.33
|-
! Total
! 385!!237!!84!!64!!748!!320!!+428!!61.56!!70.59
|-
| rowspan=5| 1996–97
| rowspan=5| 
| rowspan=5 align=left| Petros Ravousis
| rowspan=5 align=left| 1996–07–10
| rowspan=5 align=left| 1997–06–30
| bgcolor=#FFD700| 1996 Greek Super Cup3
| 1||0||1||0||1||1||0||00.00||33.33
| rowspan=5| Greek Cup: 1Greek Super Cup: 1
|-
|bgcolor=#C0C0C0| Alpha Ethniki
| 34||22||6||6||75||28||+47||64.71||70.59
|-
|bgcolor=#FFD700| Greek Cup
| 9||7||2||0||22||6||+16||77.78||85.19
|-
| UEFA Cup Winners' Cup
| 6||4||1||1||9||4||+5||66.67||72.22
|-
! Total
! 50!!33!!10!!7!!107!!39!!+68!!66.00!!72.67
|-
| rowspan=5| 1997–98
| rowspan=4| 
| rowspan=4 align=left| Dumitru Dumitriu
| rowspan=4 align=left| 1997–07–01
| rowspan=4 align=left| 1998–03–29
| Alpha Ethniki (1)
| 28||19||6||3||49||23||+26||67.86||75.00
| rowspan=4| —
|-
| UEFA Cup Winners' Cup
| 6||3||1||2||12||5||+7||50.00||55.56
|-
| Greek Cup
| 2||0||0||2||1||4||-3||00.00||00.00
|-
! Total
! 36!!22!!7!!7!!62!!32!!+30!!61.11!!67.59
|-
| 
| align=left| Antonis Minou1
| align=left| 1998–04–03
| align=left| 1998–06–27
| Alpha Ethniki (2)
| 6||3||2||1||12||7||+5||50.00||61.11
| —
|-
| rowspan=7| 1998–99
| rowspan=3| 
| rowspan=3 align=left| Dragoslav Stepanović
| rowspan=3 align=left| 1998–06–30
| rowspan=3 align=left| 1998–10–28
| Alpha Ethniki (1)
| 7||5||2||0||13||4||+9||71.43||80.95
| rowspan=3| —
|-
| UEFA Cup
| 4||1||1||2||9||10||-1||25.00||33.33
|-
! Total
! 11!!6!!3!!2!!22!!14!!+8!!54.54!!63.64
|-
| rowspan=3| 
| rowspan=3 align=left| Takis Karagiozopoulos1
| rowspan=3 align=left| 1998–10–29
| rowspan=3 align=left| 1998–11–25
| Alpha Ethniki (2)
| 3||2||0||1||6||4||+2||66.66||66.66
| rowspan=3| —
|-
| Greek Cup
| 1||0||0||1||0||1||-1||00.00||00.00
|-
! Total
! 4!!2!!0!!2!!6!!5!!+1!!50.00!!50.00
|-
| 
| align=left| Oleg Blokhin
| align=left| 1998–11–26
| align=left| 1999–05–30
| Alpha Ethniki (3)
| 24||16||4||4||52||19||+33||66.67||72.22
| —
|-
| rowspan=8| 1999–00
| rowspan=5| 
| rowspan=5 align=left| Ljubiša Tumbaković
| rowspan=5 align=left| 1999–06–01
| rowspan=5 align=left| 2000–01–07
| Alpha Ethniki (1)
| 13||6||3||4||25||18||+7||46.15||53.85
| rowspan=5| —
|-
| UEFA Cup
| 6||3||1||2||11||6||+5||50.00||55.56
|-
| Greek Cup (1)
| 5||5||0||0||19||3||+16||100.00||100.00
|-
| UEFA Champions League
| 2||0||1||1||0||1||-1||00.00||16.67
|-
! Total
! 26!!14!!5!!7!!55!!28!!+27!!53.85!!60.26
|-
| 
| align=left| Takis Karagiozopoulos1
| align=left| 2000–01–08
| align=left| 2000–01–09
| Alpha Ethniki (2)
| 1||0||0||1||2||3||-1||00.00||00.00
| —
|-
| rowspan=6| 
| rowspan=6 align=left| Giannis Pathiakakis
| rowspan=6 align=left| 2000–01–10
| rowspan=6 align=left| 2001–01–24
| bgcolor=#CD7F32| Alpha Ethniki (3)
| 20||14||3||3||42||18||+24||70.00||75.00
| rowspan=6| Greek Cup: 1
|-
| bgcolor=#FFD700| Greek Cup (2)
| 6||4||1||1||18||4||+14||66.67||72.22
|-
| rowspan=7| 2000–01
| Alpha Ethniki (1)
| 15||8||3||4||29||22||+7||53.33||60.00
|-
| Greek Cup
| 12||8||2||2||40||17||+23||66.67||72.22
|-
| UEFA Cup (1)
| 6||3||2||1||16||8||+8||50.00||61.11
|-
! Total
! 59!!37!!11!!11!!145!!69!!+76!!62.71!!68.93
|-
| rowspan=3| 
| rowspan=3 align=left| Toni Savevski2
| rowspan=3 align=left| 2001–01–25
| rowspan=3 align=left| 2001–06–15
| bgcolor=#CD7F32| Alpha Ethniki (2)
| 15||11||1||3||32||12||+20||73.33||75.56
| rowspan=3| —
|-
| UEFA Cup (2)
| 2||0||0||2||0||6||-6||00.00||00.00
|-
! Total
! 17!!11!!3!!5!!32!!18!!+14||64.71!!70.59
|-
| rowspan=5| 2001–02
| rowspan=5| 
| rowspan=5 align=left| Fernando Santos
| rowspan=5 align=left| 2001–06–17
| rowspan=5 align=left| 2002–05–09
|-
| bgcolor=#C0C0C0| Alpha Ethniki
| 26||19||1||6||65||28||+37||73.08||74.36
| rowspan=4| Greek Cup: 1
|-
| bgcolor=#FFD700| Greek Cup3
| 15||12||3||0||44||9||+35||80.00||86.67
|-
| UEFA Cup3
| 10||6||2||2||24||14||+10||60.00||66.67
|-
! Total
! 51!!38!!5!!8!!134!!51!!+83!!74.51!!77.78
|-
| rowspan=4| 2002–03
| rowspan=8| 
| rowspan=8 align=left| Dušan Bajević
| rowspan=8 align=left| 2002–05–20
| rowspan=8 align=left| 2004–01–25
| bgcolor=#CD7F32| Alpha Ethniki
| 30||21||5||4||74||29||+45||70.00||75.56
| rowspan=8| —
|-
| bgcolor=#CD7F32| Greek Cup
| 10||6||3||1||19||6||+13||60.00||70.00
|-
| UEFA Champions League
| 8||2||6||0||11||8||+3||25.00||50.00
|-
| UEFA Cup
| 4||2||1||1||8||2||+6||50.00||58.33
|-
| rowspan=8| 2003–04
| Alpha Ethniki (1)
| 18||10||5||3||39||17||+22||55.55||64.81
|-
| UEFA Champions League
| 8||1||2||5||4||13||-9||12.50||20.83
|-
| Greek Cup (1)
| 4||3||1||0||11||2||+9||75.00||83.33
|-
! Total
! 82!!45!!23!!14!!166!!77!!+89!!54.88!!64.23
|-
| 
| align=left| Dimitris Bouroutzikas1
| align=left| 2004–01–26
| align=left| 2004–02–01
| Alpha Ethniki (2)
| 1||0||0||1||1||2||-1||00.00||00.00
| —
|-
| rowspan=3| 
| rowspan=3 align=left| Ilie Dumitrescu
| rowspan=3 align=left| 2004–02–02
| rowspan=3 align=left| 2004–05–25
| Alpha Ethniki (3)
| 11||6||2||3||17||13||+4||54.54||60.61
| rowspan=3| —
|-
| bgcolor=#CD7F32| Greek Cup (2)
| 4||2||1||1||6||5||+1||50.00||58.33
|-
! Total
! 15!!8!!3!!4!!23!!18!!+5!!53.33!!60.00
|-
| rowspan=3| 2004–05
| rowspan=7| 
| rowspan=7 align=left| Fernando Santos
| rowspan=7 align=left| 2004–07–16
| rowspan=7 align=left| 2006–05–13
| bgcolor=#CD7F32| Alpha Ethniki
| 30||17||11||2||46||22||+24||56.67||68.89
| rowspan=7| —
|-
| bgcolor=#CD7F32| Greek Cup3
| 10||5||3||2||17||8||+9||50.00||60.00
|-
| UEFA Cup
| 6||1||1||4||6||13||-7||16.67||22.22
|-
| rowspan=4| 2005–06
| bgcolor=#C0C0C0| Alpha Ethniki
| 30||21||4||5||42||20||+22||70.00||74.44
|-
| bgcolor=#C0C0C0| Greek Cup3
| 8||3||3||2||10||6||+4||37.50||50.00
|-
| UEFA Cup
| 2||0||1||1||0||1||-1||00.00||16.67
|-
! Total
! 86!!47!!23!!16!!121!!70!!+51!!54.65!!63.57
|-
| rowspan=4| 2006–07
| rowspan=9| 
| rowspan=9 align=left| Lorenzo Serra Ferrer
| rowspan=9 align=left| 2006–06–07
| rowspan=9 align=left| 2008–02–12
| bgcolor=#C0C0C0| Super League Greece
| 30||18||8||4||60||27||+33||60.00||68.89
| rowspan=9| —
|-
| Greek Cup3
| 1||0||1||0||0||0||0||00.00||33.33
|-
| UEFA Cup
| 2||0||0||2||0||4||-4||00.00||00.00
|-
| UEFA Champions League
| 8||4||2||2||11||10||+1||50.00||58.33
|-
| rowspan=9| 2007–08
| Super League Greece (1)
| 20||14||0||6||41||13||+28||70.00||70.00
|-
| UEFA Cup (1)
| 6||2||2||2||7||5||+2||33.33||44.44
|-
| Greek Cup
| 2||1||0||1||2||2||0||50.00||50.00
|-
| UEFA Champions League
| 2||0||0||2||1||6||-5||00.00||00.00
|- 
! Total
! 71!!39!!13!!19!!122!!67!!+55!!54.93!!61.03
|-
| rowspan=4| 
| rowspan=4 align=left| Nikos Kostenoglou1
| rowspan=4 align=left| 2008–02–12
| rowspan=4 align=left| 2008–05–14
| bgcolor=#C0C0C0| Super League Greece (2)
| 10||8||2||0||24||4||+20||80.00||86.67
| rowspan=4| —
|-
| UEFA Cup (2)
| 2||0||1||1||1||4||−3||00.00||16.67
|-
| bgcolor=#C0C0C0| Super League Greece Play–offs
| 6||2||2||2||10||11||−1||33.33||44.44
|-
! Total
! 18!!10!!5!!3!!35!!19!!+16!!55.56!!64.81
|-
| rowspan=7| 2008–09
| rowspan=4| 
| rowspan=4 align=left| Giorgos Donis
| rowspan=4 align=left| 2008–05–14
| rowspan=4 align=left| 2008–11–17
| Super League Greece (1)
| 10||3||6||1||13||12||+1||30.00||50.00
| rowspan=4| —
|-
| UEFA Cup
| 2||0||1||1||2||3||−1||00.00||00.00
|-
| Greek Cup (1)3
| 1||1||0||0||2||1||+1||100.00||100.00
|-
! Total
! 13!!4!!7!!2!!17!!16!!+1!!30.77!!N/A
|-
| rowspan=10| 
| rowspan=10 align=left| Dušan Bajević
| rowspan=10 align=left| 2008–11–21
| rowspan=10 align=left| 2010–09–27
| Super League Greece (2)
| 20||11||7||2||27||12||+15||55.00||66.67
| rowspan=10| —
|-
| bgcolor=#C0C0C0| Greek Cup (2)4
| 6||3||1||2||10||7||+3||50.00||55.56
|-
| bgcolor=#C0C0C0| Super League Greece Play–offs
| 6||3||2||1||8||6||+2||50.00||61.11
|-
| rowspan=4| 2009–10
| Super League Greece
| 30||15||8||7||43||31||+12||50.00||58.89
|-
| UEFA Europa League
| 8||2||1||5||9||13||-4||25.00||29.17
|-
| bgcolor=#C0C0C0| Super League Greece Play–offs
| 6||2||2||2||8||7||+1||33.33||44.44
|-
| Greek Cup3
| 1||0||0||1||0||1||-1||00.00||00.00
|-
| rowspan=10| 2010–11
| Super League Greece (1)
| 4||1||1||2||6||7||-1||25.00||33.33
|-
| UEFA Europa League (1)
| 3||2||1||0||5||2||+3||66.67||77.78
|-
! Total
! 84!!39!!23!!22!!116!!86!!+30!!46.43!!55.56
|-
| rowspan=3| 
| rowspan=3 align=left| Bledar Kola1
| rowspan=3 align=left| 2010–09–26
| rowspan=3 align=left| 2010–10–08
| Super League Greece (2)
| 1||1||0||0||1||0||+1||100.00||100.00
| rowspan=3| —
|-
| UEFA Europa League (2)
| 1||0||0||1||2||4||-2||00.00||00.00
|-
! Total
! 2!!1!!0!!1!!3!!4!!-1!!50.00!!50.00
|-
| rowspan=7| 
| rowspan=7 align=left| Manolo Jiménez
| rowspan=7 align=left| 2010–10–08
| rowspan=7 align=left| 2011–10–05
| bgcolor=#CD7F32| Super League Greece (3)
| 26||14||4||8||40||30||+10||53.84||58.97
| rowspan=6| Greek Cup: 1
|-
| bgcolor=#FFD700| Greek Cup
| 7||5||1||1||17||4||+13||71.43||76.19
|-
| bgcolor=#CD7F32| Super League Greece Play–offs
| 6||2||1||3||6||6||0||33.33||38.89
|-
| UEFA Europa League
| 5||1||1||3||6||10||−4||20.00||26.66
|-
| rowspan=8| 2011–12
| Super League Greece (1)
| 4||3||0||1||6||6||+1||75.00||75.00
|-
| UEFA Europa League (1)3
| 4||1||1||2||4||7||−3||25.00||33.33
|-
! Total
! 52!!26!!8!!18!!79!!63!!+15!!50.00!!55.12
|-
| rowspan=5| 
| rowspan=5 align=left| Nikos Kostenoglou
| rowspan=5 align=left| 2011–10–05
| rowspan=5 align=left| 2012–06–20
| Super League Greece (2)
| 26||10||9||7||30||24||+6||38.46||50.00
| rowspan=5| —
|-
| bgcolor=#C0C0C0| Super League Greece Play–offs
| 6||3||0||3||7||5||+2||50.00||50.00
|-
| UEFA Europa League (2)
| 4||1||0||3||6||9||−3||25.00||25.00
|-
| Greek Cup
| 2||1||0||1||1||2||−1||50.00||50.00
|-
! Total
! 38!!15!!9!!14!!44!!40!!+4!!39.47!!47.36
|-
| rowspan=6| 2012–13
| 
| align=left| Vangelis Vlachos
| align=left| 2012–06–26
| align=left| 2012–09–30
| Super League Greece (1)
| 5||0||1||4||2||6||-4||00.00||06.67
| —
|-
| 
| align=left| Manolis Papadopoulos1
| align=left| 2012–10–06
| align=left| 2012–10–10
| Super League Greece (2)
| 1||0||1||0||1||1||0||00.00||33.33
| —
|-
| rowspan=3| 
| rowspan=3 align=left| Ewald Lienen
| rowspan=3 align=left| 2012–10–10
| rowspan=3 align=left| 2013–04–09
| Super League Greece (3)
| 22||8||4||10||18||25||−7||36.36||42.42
| rowspan=3| —
|-
| Greek Cup
| 2||0||1||1||0||1||−1||00.00||16.67
|-
! Total
! 24!!8!!5!!11!!18!!26!!–8!!33.33!!40.28
|-
| rowspan=8 | 
| rowspan=8 align=left| Traianos Dellas2
| rowspan=8 align=left| 2013–04–09
| rowspan=8 align=left|2015–10–20
| Super League Greece (4)
| 2||0||0||2||0||4||-4||00.00||00.00
|  rowspan=8| Football League 2 (6th Group): 1  Football League (South Group): 1
|-
|  rowspan=2| 2013–14
| Football League 2
| 28||24||3||1||80||14||+66||85.71||1st
|-
| Football League 2 Cup
| 4||3||0||1||9||2||+7||75.00||QF
|-
| rowspan=3| 2014–15
| Football League
| 22||20||2||0||61||10||+51||90.91||93.94
|-
| Promotion play-offs
| 10||5||3||2||14||9||+5||50.00||60.00
|-
| Greek Cup
| 9||5||3||1||15||3||+12||55.56||60.67
|-
| rowspan=11| 2015–16
| Super League Greece (1)
| 7||4||1||2||10||8||+2||57.14||61.90
|-
! Total
! 82!!61!!12!!9!!189!!50!!+139!!74.39!!79.27
|-
| rowspan=3| 
| rowspan=3 align=left| Stelios Manolas1
| rowspan=3 align=left| 2015–10–20
| rowspan=3 align=left| 2015–10–29
| Super League Greece (2)
| 1||1||0||0||5||1||+4||100.00||100.00
| rowspan=3| —
|-
| Greek Cup (1)
| 1||1||0||0||1||0||+1||100.00||100.00
|-
! Total
! 2!!2!!0!!0!!6!!1!!+5!!100.00!!100.00
|-
| rowspan=3| 
| rowspan=3 align=left| Gus Poyet
| rowspan=3 align=left| 2015–10–29
| rowspan=3 align=left| 2016–04–19
| bgcolor=#CD7F32| Super League Greece (3)
| 22||12||5||5||28||12||+16||54.55||62.12
| rowspan=3| —
|-
| Greek Cup (2)
| 6||6||0||0||19||1||+18||100.00||100.00
|-
! Total
! 28!!18!!5!!5!!47!!13!!+34!!64.29!!70.24
|-
| rowspan=3| 
| rowspan=3 align=left| Stelios Manolas1
| rowspan=3 align=left| 2016-04-20
| rowspan=3 align=left| 2016-06-06
| bgcolor=#FFD700|  Greek Cup (3)
| 3||2||1||0||4||2||+2||66.67||77.78
| rowspan=3| Greek Cup: 1
|-
| bgcolor=#C0C0C0| Super League Greece Play-offs
| 6||2||1||3||5||7||-2||33.33||38.89
|-
! Total
! 9!!4!!2!!3!!9!!9!!0!!44.44!!51.85
|-
| rowspan=9| 2016–17
| rowspan=3| 
| rowspan=3 align=left| Temur Ketsbaia
| rowspan=3 align=left| 2016-06-06
| rowspan=3 align=left| 2016–10–18
| Super League Greece (1)
| 5||3||1||1||8||5||+3||60.00||66.67
| rowspan=3| —
|-
| UEFA Europa League
| 2||0||1||1||0||1||-1||00.00||16.67
|-
! Total
! 7!!3!!2!!2!!8!!6!!2!!42.86!!52.38
|-
| rowspan=3| 
| rowspan=3 align=left| José Morais
| rowspan=3 align=left| 2016–10–18
| rowspan=3 align=left| 2017–01–19
| Super League Greece (2)
| 11||2||6||3||15||11||+4||18.18||36.36
| rowspan=3| —
|-
| Greek Cup (1)
| 3||1||2||0||6||2||+4||33.33||55.56
|-
! Total
! 14!!3!!8!!3!!21!!13!!+8!!21.43!!40.48
|-
| rowspan=8| 
| rowspan=8 align=left| Manolo Jiménez
| rowspan=8 align=left| 2017–01–19
| rowspan=8 align=left| 2018–05–25
| Super League Greece (3)
| 14||9||4||1||31||7||+24||64.29||73.81
| rowspan=8| Super League: 1
|-
| bgcolor=#FFD700| Super League Greece Play-offs
| 6||4||0||2||5||3||+2||66.67||66.67
|-
| bgcolor=#C0C0C0| Greek Cup (2)
| 7||4||1||2||13||4||+9||57.14||61.90
|-
| rowspan=5| 2017–18
| UEFA Champions League
| 2||0||0||2||0||3||-3||00.00||00.00
|-
| bgcolor=#FFD700| Super League Greece
| 30||21||7||2||50||12||+38||70.00||77.78
|-
| bgcolor=#C0C0C0| Greek Cup
| 10||7||1||2||21||7||+16||70.00||73.33
|-
| UEFA Europa League
| 10||2||8||0||10||6||+4||20.00||46.67
|-
! Total
! 79!!47!!21!!11!!130!!42!!+88!!57.69!!68.35
|-
| rowspan=7| 2018–19
| rowspan=4| 
| rowspan=4 align=left| Marinos Ouzounidis
| rowspan=4 align=left| 2018–05–26
| rowspan=4 align=left| 2019–02–05
| Super League Greece (1)
| 19||12||4||3||33||8||+25||63.16||70.18
| rowspan=4| —
|-
| Greek Cup (1)
| 5||4||1||0||15||3||+12||80.00|||86.67
|-
| UEFA Champions League
| 10||2||2||6||8||17||-9||20.00||26.67
|-
! Total
! 34!!18!!7!!9!!56!!28!!+28!!52.94!!54.46
|-
| rowspan=3| 
| rowspan=3 align=left| Manolo Jiménez
| rowspan=3 align=left| 2019–02–06
| rowspan=3 align=left| 2019–05–27
| bgcolor=#CD7F32| Super League Greece (2)
| 11||6||2||3||17||11||+6||54.55||60.61
| rowspan=3| —
|-
| bgcolor=#C0C0C0| Greek Cup (2)
| 5||4||0||1||10||1||+9||80.00||80.00
|-
! Total
! 16!!10!!2!!4!!27!!12!!+15!!62.50!!66.67
|-
| rowspan=9| 2019–20
| rowspan=3| 
| rowspan=3 align=left| Miguel Cardoso
| rowspan=3 align=left| 2019–05–28
| rowspan=3 align=left| 2019–08–25
| UEFA Europa League (1)
| 3||1||1||1||4||4||0||33.33||44.44
| rowspan=3| —
|-
| Super League Greece (1)
| 1||0||0||1||1||2||-1||00.00||00.00
|-
! Total
! 4!!1!!1!!2!!5!!6!!-1!!25.00!!33.33
|-
| rowspan=3| 
| rowspan=3 align=left| Nikos Kostenoglou2
| rowspan=3 align=left| 2019–08–26
| rowspan=3 align=left| 2019–12–08
| UEFA Europa League (2)
| 1||1||0||0||2||0||+2||100.00||100.00
| rowspan=3| —
|-
| Super League Greece (2)
| 12||6||3||3||22||15||+7||50.00||62.50
|-
! Total
! 13!!7!!3!!3!!24!!15!!+9!!53.85!!61.54
|-
| rowspan=6| 
| rowspan=6 align=left| Massimo Carrera
| rowspan=6 align=left| 2019–12–08
| rowspan=6 align=left| 2020–12–22
| bgcolor=#CD7F32| Super League Greece (3)
| 13||9||3||1||19||5||+14||69.23||76.92
| rowspan=6| —
|-
| bgcolor=#CD7F32| Super League Greece Play-offs
| 10||5||3||2||17||10||+7||50.00||60.00
|-
| bgcolor=#C0C0C0| Greek Cup3
| 7||3||3||1||12||6||+6||60.00||80.00
|-
| rowspan=7| 2020–21
| UEFA Europa League
| 8||3||0||5||10||16||-6||37.50||37.50
|-
| Super League Greece (1)
| 12||7||3||2||23||13||+10||58.33||66.67
|-
! Total
! 50!!27!!12!!11!!81!!40!!+31!!54.00!!62.00
|-
| rowspan=4| 
| rowspan=4 align=left| Manolo Jiménez
| rowspan=4 align=left| 2020–12–23
| rowspan=4 align=left| 2021–05–26
| bgcolor=#CD7F32| Super League Greece (2)
| 14||7||3||4||18||16||+2||50.00||57.14
| rowspan=4| —
|-
| bgcolor=#CD7F32| Greek Cup
| 6||2||0||4||8||8||0||33.33||33.33
|-
| Super League Greece Play-offs
| 10||3||3||4||12||16||-6||30.00||40.00
|-
! Total
! 30!!12!!6!!12!!38!!40!!-2!!40.00!!46.67
|-
| rowspan=9| 2021–22
| rowspan=3| 
| rowspan=3 align=left| Vladan Milojević
| rowspan=3 align=left|2021–05–27
| rowspan=3 align=left|2021–10–08
| UEFA Europa Conference League4
| 2||1||0||1||2||2||0||50.00||50.00
| rowspan=3| —
|-
| Super League Greece (1)
| 5||3||1||1||10||6||+4||60.00||66.67
|-
! Total
! 7!!4!!1!!3!!12!!8!!+4!!57.14!!61.90
|-
| rowspan=3 | 
| rowspan=3 align=left| Argiris Giannikis
| rowspan=3 align=left|2021–10–11
| rowspan=3 align=left|2022–03–01
| Super League Greece (2)
| 19||10||2||7||29||20||+9||52.63||56.14
| rowspan=3| —
|-
| bgcolor=| Greek Cup
| 4||1||2||1||6||3||+3||25.00||41.67
|-
! Total
! 23!!11!!4!!8!!35!!23!!+12!!47.82!!53.62
|-
| rowspan=3| 
| rowspan=3 align=left| Sokratis Ofrydopoulos1
| rowspan=3 align=left|2022–03–02
| rowspan=3 align=left|2022–05–19
| bgcolor=#CD7F32| Super League Greece (3)
| 2||1||1||0||3||2||+1||50.00||66.67
|rowspan=3| —
|-
| Super League Greece Play-offs
| 10||2||4||4||14||14||0||20.00||33.33
|-
! Total
! 12!!3!!5!!4!!17!!16!!+1!!25.00!!38.89
|-
| rowspan=4| 2022–23
| rowspan=4| 
| rowspan=4 align=left| Matías Almeyda
| rowspan=4 align=left|2022–05–20
| rowspan=4 align=left|
| bgcolor=#C0C0C0| Super League Greece
| 26||19||2||5||51||14||+37||73.08||75.64
| rowspan=4| —
|-
| Greek Cup
| 6||6||0||0||16||1||+15||100.00||100.00
|-
| Super League Greece Play-offs
| ||||||||||||||||
|-
! Total
! 32!!25!!2!!5!!67!!15!!+52!!78.13!!80.20
|-

1Served as caretaker manager.
2Served as caretaker manager before being appointed permanently.
3Extra time taken into account.
4Penalty shout-out results taken into account.

Only competitive matches are counted. Wins, losses and draws are results at the final whistle.

Manager Records

Honours

Matches

Competitive, official competitions only. Wins, appear in parentheses.

References

Lists of association football managers by club in Greece
 Lists
Football managers